One America may refer to:
 One America Appeal, an American nonprofit organization
 One America Committee, a political action committee founded by American politician John Edwards
 One America Initiative, a U.S. Presidential initiative
 One America News Network, an American right-wing pay television news channel
 One America Plaza, a building in San Diego, California

See also
 Two Americas